A slip dress is a woman's dress that closely resembles an underslip or petticoat. It is traditionally cut on the bias, with spaghetti straps. The slip dress looked like an undergarment, but was intended to be seen, and through the use of lace and sheer elements, offer glimpses of the body beneath. Designers associated with slip dresses include John Galliano, whose debut design for Dior was a lace-trimmed slip dress worn by Diana, Princess of Wales in 1996; Calvin Klein and Narciso Rodriguez.

History
Slip dresses first became widely worn in the last decade of the 20th century, as part of the underwear-as-outerwear trend, when they were made from layered chiffon, polyester satins and charmeuse, and often trimmed with lace. The dresses typified the sartorial minimalism of the 1990s. The slip dress became associated with the decade's supermodels, notably Kate Moss, who garnered attention with a sheer version in 1993. Courtney Love's fondness for the style granted slip dresses grunge credibility.

The style enjoyed renewed popularity starting in the late 2010s and continuing into the 2020s as part of a broader revival of 1990s fashion trends. The spring 2016 collections of both Yves Saint Laurent and Burberry featured the garment. Since then, slip dresses have been a red carpet staple. The Versace spring 2021 ready-to-wear collection included slip dresses with a beachy theme.

References

Dresses
1990s fashion
https://www.rivalgirl.com/blogs/rivalgirl-edit/sheer-dressing-lingerie-dress-slips
Women's clothing